Sunflower is an unincorporated community in Washington County, Alabama, United States, located  north of McIntosh. Sunflower has a post office with ZIP code 36581.

References

Unincorporated communities in Washington County, Alabama
Unincorporated communities in Alabama